Kenyaconger heemstrai is a species of eel in the family Congridae. It is the only member of its genus. It is only found in the Indian Ocean off the coast of Kenya at a depth of 275 meters.

References

Endemic fauna of Kenya
Congridae
Taxa named by David G. Smith
Taxa named by Emma Stanislavovna Karmovskaya
Fish described in 2003